The music of Malta ranges across a spectrum of genres such as traditional folk music, metal and various forms of electronica.

History

Għana is the traditional folk music of Malta.

Malta organises its own Malta Song Festival yearly since 1960.

In 1971 Joe Grech was the first singer to represent Malta in the Eurovision Song Contest. Later, Thea Garrett won the Malta Song for Europe 2010 called My Dream. Lynn Chircop is an infamous Maltese singer who represented Malta at the Eurovision 2003 with a beautiful pop song called "To Dream Again". It was sung in Riga with 5 additional backing singers on the stage. Chircop got 4 points at the end of voting process. Morena is another artist who is a winner of Malta Song for Europe 2008 called VODKA. Klinsmann participated in Malta Song for Europe in 2007 [She Gives me Wings] and 2008 [Go finalist song]. Claudia Faniello was the second runner up in Malta song for Europe 2008 who participated with the songs Caravaggio and Sunrise. Chiara represented Malta in Eurovision a total of 3 times, 1998, 2005, 2009.  Gaia Cauchi represented and won for Malta in the Junior Eurovision Song Contest in 2013. Gianluca Bezzina represented Malta in 2013. Destiny Chukunyere represented and won for Malta in the Junior Eurovision Song Contest in 2015. Chukunyere represented Malta at Eurovision 2020 after winning the Maltese version of X Factor.

Bibliography 

 Marcello Sorce Keller. “Malta, History, Culture and Geography of Music”, Janet Sturman (ed.) The SAGE Encyclopedia of Music and Culture. Los Angeles: SAGE Reference, 2019, Vol. III, 1382-1384.
 Marcello Sorce Keller. “Malta, Modern and Contemporary Performance Practice”, Janet Sturman (ed.) The SAGE Encyclopedia of Music and Culture. Los Angeles: SAGE Reference, 2019, Vol. III, 1384-1386.

Artists

Abysmal Torment
Achiral
Beheaded
Adrian V
Alex Grech
Antonio Olivari
Apotheosis
Arachnid
Beangrowers
Bitterside
BNI (Batteries not Included)
Chasing Pandora
Chiara
Debbie Scerri
Destiny (singer)
Emma Muscat
Fabrizio Faniello
Gabriela N
Gianluca Bezzina
Grandayy
Gaia Cauchi
Hooligan
Insurgence
Ira Losco
Jennings
Jessika Muscat
Julie Zahra
Joe Grech
Knockturn Alley
Lithomancy
Ludwig Galea
Luke Chappell
Mary Spiteri
Miss Roberta
The Myth (band)
Olivia Lewis
Owen Luellen
Ray Buttigieg
Recoil
Red Electric
Renato Micallef
Renzo Spiteri
Roger Scannura
Stalko
Tenishia
The Travellers
Walter Micallef
Wintermoods

See also
Malta International Music Competitions, Valletta/Mdina, Malta
 List of classical music competitions
 Malta in the Eurovision Song Contest
 Malta in the Junior Eurovision Song Contest
 Malta Music Awards
 Malta Philharmonic Orchestra
 Sine Macula Choir

Instruments
 Żaqq
 Friction drum

External links
Malta International Music Master Classes, VFIMF Festival, Malta International Music Competition
Malta International Violin/Viola/Bow Making Competition and Instrumental Master Classes
Central Academy of Arts
Malta Music Online - Website sharing Maltese Music Bands' information
Music of Malta
MaltaVoyager
Dance music and clubbing in Malta
- Maltese alternative scene
Maltese Techno and Electro Music scene
Malta International Music Master Classes and more cultural projects and courses
Maltese Music Internet Radio at Malta Network Resources

Maltese music